Jozsef Phelim Keaveny (born 12 October 1999) is a professional footballer who plays as a forward.

Club career
Keaveny played for his local club Leicester City for 10 years in their youth teams. He was released by Leicester in June 2019 and signed for AEK Larnaca of the Cypriot First Division on 9 July 2019. He made his debut in senior football on 8 November 2019, coming off the bench in the 84th minute in a game against Doxa Katokopias and scoring the winner in the 95th minute in a 2–1 win for his side. At the end of 2020, he returned to Leicester City as a mentor after being forced to retire from professional football due to injury. In August 2021, he was playing part-time for United Counties League side Anstey Nomads. On 20 January 2022, Keaveny returned to professional football to join C-League side Angkor Tiger.

International career
Keaveny was called up to the Republic of Ireland U17 squad in 2016 for 2 games against Switzerland U17. He is eligible to play for Republic of Ireland as 3 of his grandparents are from there. He is also eligible to play for Hungary through his maternal grandfather from Budapest and England as it is his country of birth.

Personal life
Keaveny grew up a Celtic and Republic of Ireland fan, stating that he idolised Roy Keane, a former player with both.

Career statistics

Club

Notes

References

External links
Profile at United Counties League

1999 births
Living people
Republic of Ireland association footballers
Association football forwards
Cypriot First Division players
Leicester City F.C. players
AEK Larnaca FC players
Anstey Nomads F.C. players
Expatriate footballers in Cyprus
Republic of Ireland expatriate association footballers
Irish expatriate sportspeople in Cyprus
Footballers from Leicester
Irish people of Hungarian descent
Expatriate footballers in Cambodia
English expatriate footballers
English expatriate sportspeople in Cambodia
Angkor Tiger FC players